Fisher Island is an ice-covered island  long, lying just north of Edward VII Peninsula where it marks the Western side of the entrance to Sulzberger Bay. Mapped from surveys by the USGS and U.S. Navy air photos (1959–65). Named in 1966 by US-ACAN for Wayne Fisher of the United States Department of State.

See also 
 Composite Antarctic Gazetteer
 List of Antarctic islands south of 60° S
 SCAR
 Territorial claims in Antarctica

References

External links

Islands of the Ross Dependency
King Edward VII Land